The  Hammamet International Festival is an annual festival of music and art  in the coastal city of Hammamet in Tunisia. It was established in 1964 and is held in July and August in the amphitheatre of 1000 seats overlooking the Gulf of Hammamet.  It is organized by the Ministry of Culture
, which manages and appoints the director. Since 2014, the Centre and the festival have been under the direction of Kamel Ferjani. In the 1980s, Ute Lemper, Mikis Theodorakis, Miriam Makeba made appearances, and more recently, Victoria Abril, Emir Kusturica, Tina Arena, Anouar Brahem, Raouf Ben Yaghlane, Leila Hjaiej and French rap group IAM4 have appeared.

References

External links
Official web site (Fr.)

Festivals in Tunisia
Hammamet, Tunisia
1964 establishments in Tunisia
Music festivals in Tunisia
Summer events in Tunisia
 Recurring events established in 1964